Sanna Frostevall (born 29 August 1979) is a Swedish former association footballer who played in the Damallsvenskan for Sunnanå SK. She played for the Newcastle United Jets in the 2008-09 Australian W-League season.

Career
Born in Ångermanland, Frostevall began playing football with Skellefteå club Själevads IK. She played six seasons in the Damallsvenskan, four of them with Sunnanå SK, including a fifth-place finish in 2007. Frostevall retired from playing in January 2011 after being unable to rehabilitate a knee injury while working full-time.

After she retired from playing, she became an assistant manager for Själevads IK.

References 

Swedish women's footballers
Swedish expatriates in Australia
Living people
Sunnanå SK players
Newcastle Jets FC (A-League Women) players
Expatriate women's soccer players in Australia
Damallsvenskan players
1979 births
Women's association footballers not categorized by position